Clemens Doppler (born 6 September 1980) is a beach volleyball player from Austria.

He and teammate Peter Gartmayer represented Austria at the 2008 Summer Olympics in Beijing, China.  Although he qualified for the 2004 Summer Olympics, an injury kept him out and he was replaced by Florian Gosch.

After the 2008 Summer Olympics, Doppler played with partner Matthias Mellitzer from 2009 until the end of the end of the 2011 season. On 21 October 2011 Doppler and Mellitzer announced their split. Media and the press speculated that Doppler will team up with fellow Beach Volleyballer Alexander Horst who also announced his split with one-year partner Daniel Müllner in October 2011.

He and Horst did team up for the 2012 Summer Olympics, where they were eliminated in the preliminary round.

Sponsors
Swatch

External links
 Athlete bio at 2008 Olympics site

1980 births
Living people
Beach volleyball players at the 2008 Summer Olympics
Beach volleyball players at the 2012 Summer Olympics
Beach volleyball players at the 2016 Summer Olympics
Austrian beach volleyball players
Olympic beach volleyball players of Austria
Men's beach volleyball players